Lithuania competed at the 2022 World Athletics Championships in Eugene, Oregon, United States, from 15 to 24 July 2022. Lithuania entered 9 athletes.

Medalists 
The following competitors from Lithuania won medals at the Championships:

Results

Men
Track and road events

Field events

Women
Track and road events

Field events

References

External links
Lithuania – World Athletics Championships, Oregon22 worldathletics.org 

Nations at the 2022 World Athletics Championships
World Championships in Athletics
Lithuania at the World Championships in Athletics